Danny O'Keefe (born May 20, 1943) is an American folk singer and songwriter.

Career
In 1968, O'Keefe was a member of a four-man heavy psychedelic rock band named Calliope. The group recorded one album, Steamed, for Buddah Records before disbanding.

O'Keefe is best known for the hit single, "Good Time Charlie's Got the Blues", which was released in September 1972, and reached number 9 on the U.S. Billboard Hot 100 chart, and for "The Road", covered by Jackson Browne on Running on Empty. "Good Time Charlie's Got the Blues" stayed on the Billboard chart for 14 weeks and sold a million copies. Sales culminated in a gold disc issued by the R.I.A.A. in June 1973. The song became O'Keefe's only song to reach the Australian top 100, peaking at number 53 in February 1973. In Canada an earlier single, Covered Wagon, had reached number 86 on March 6, 1971.

O'Keefe's songs have been covered by numerous musicians, including Jackson Browne ("The Road"), Gary Stewart ("Quits"), Elvis Presley, Glen Campbell ("Quits"), John Denver ("Along For The Ride"), Donny Hathaway ("Magdalena"), Leo Sayer ("Magdalena"), Jerry Lee Lewis, Judy Collins ("Angel Spread Your Wings"), Leon Russell, Willie Nelson, Waylon Jennings, Jimmy Buffett ("Souvenirs"), Alison Krauss, Ben Harper, Cab Calloway, Mark-Almond, Andy Williams, and Dwight Yoakam ("Under the Covers"). In Italy his song "The Road" has been covered by Ron, with Italian lyrics written by Lucio Dalla (and re-titled "Una città per cantare").

In 2020, O'Keefe released "Looking Glass & The Dreamers".

Discography
 Introducing Danny O'Keefe (Panorama, 1966)
 Danny O'Keefe (Cotillion, 1970)
 O'Keefe (Signpost, 1972)
 Breezy Stories (Atlantic, 1973)
 So Long Harry Truman (Atlantic, 1975)
 American Roulette (Warner Bros., 1977)
 The Seattle Tapes (First American, 1977)
 The Seattle Tapes Vol. II (First American, 1978)
 The Global Blues (Warner Bros., 1979)
 The Day to Day (Coldwater, 1984)
 Redux (Beachwood, 1989)
 Runnin' from the Devil (Miramar, 1999)
 In Time (Bicameral Songs, 2008)
 Light Leaves the West (Road Canon Music, 2015)
 Home (Road Canon Music, 2017)
 Looking Glass & The Dreamers (Road Canon Music, 2020)

References

External Links
 
 

Living people
Musicians from Spokane, Washington
1943 births
Singer-songwriters from Washington (state)
Atlantic Records artists
Warner Records artists